Sandhem Church is a church in Sandhem in Sweden. Belonging to Mullsjö-Sandhem Parish of the Church of Sweden, it was inaugurated in 1841.

References

External links

19th-century Church of Sweden church buildings
Churches completed in 1841
Churches in Mullsjö Municipality
Churches in the Diocese of Skara